This is a list of Australian football transfers for the 2006–07 A-League. Only moves featuring at least one A-League club are listed.

Clubs were able to sign players at any time, but many transfers will only officially go through on 1 June because the majority of player contracts finish on 31 May.

Transfers 

All players without a flag are Australian. Clubs without a flag are clubs participating in the A-League.

Pre-season

Regular season

References

A-League Men transfers
2006–07 A-League season
Football transfers summer 2006
Football transfers winter 2006–07